Senegal competed at the 2022 World Games held in Birmingham, United States from 7 to 17 July 2022.

Competitors
The following is the list of number of competitors in the Games.

Wushu

Senegal competed in wushu.

References

Nations at the 2022 World Games
2022
World Games